Coccopigya is a genus of sea snails, deep-sea limpets, marine gastropod mollusks in the family Cocculinidae.

Species
Species within the genus Coccopigya include:
 Coccopigya barbatula B. A. Marshall, 1986
 † Coccopigya compuncta (Marwick, 1931) 
 Coccopigya crebrilamina B. A. Marshall, 1986
 Coccopigya crinita B. A. Marshall, 1986
 Coccopigya hispida B. A. Marshall, 1986
 † Coccopigya komitica B. A. Marshall, 1986 
 Coccopigya lata (Warén, 1996)
 Coccopigya mikkelsenae McLean & Harasewych, 1995
 Coccopigya oculifera B. A. Marshall, 1986
 Coccopigya okutanii Hasegawa, 1997
 † Coccopigya otaiana B. A. Marshall, 1986 
 Coccopigya punctoradiata (Kuroda & Habe, 1949)
 Coccopigya spinigera (Jeffreys, 1883)
 Coccopigya viminensis (Rocchini, 1990)

References

 Marshall, B.A. (1986 ["1985"]). Recent and Tertiary Cocculinidae and Pseudococculinidae (Mollusca: Gastropoda) from New Zealand and New South Wales. New Zealand Journal of Zoology. 12(4): 505-546

External links

Cocculinidae
Gastropod genera